Tuvalu competed at the 2022 Commonwealth Games in Birmingham, England between 28 July and 8 August 2022. It was Tuvalu's seventh appearance at the Games.

Six athletes (five men and one woman) qualified to represent Tuvalu in three sports. Tuvalu’s team at the games consisted of Karalo Maibuca (men's 100 metres), Ampex Isaac and Saaga Malosa (men’s beach volleyball), Leatialii Afoa (lightweight boxing) and Fiu Tui (middleweight boxing). Temalini Manatoa (women's 100 metres), qualified but did not attend the games.

Preparation
Due to the lack of facilities and the size of the island being small, athletes trained on the runway of the Funafuti International Airport. The airport is the biggest open space available on the island.

Competitors
The following is the list of number of competitors qualified for the Games per sport/discipline.

Athletics

Track and road events

Beach volleyball

As of 26 April 2022, Tuvalu qualified for the men's tournament. The intended Oceania qualifier was abandoned, so the quota allocation was determined by their position among other nations from Oceania in the men's FIVB Beach Volleyball World Rankings (for performances between 16 April 2018 and 31 March 2022).

Men's tournament
Group C

Boxing

Men

References

Nations at the 2022 Commonwealth Games
Tuvalu at the Commonwealth Games
2022 in Tuvaluan sport